Florence Deshon (born Florence Danks; July 19, 1893February 4, 1922) was an American motion picture actress in silent films. Born in Tacoma, Washington, Deshon began her film career in 1915, appearing in The Beloved Vagabond, and would later star in numerous pictures for Samuel Goldwyn and Vitagraph Studios between 1918 and 1921. She was romantically involved with writer Max Eastman and actor Charlie Chaplin. Deshon died of gas asphyxiation in her New York City apartment.

Early life
Florence Deshon was born Florence Danks in Tacoma, Washington, to Samuel Danks, a musician and union organizer from Wales, and Flora Caroline Spatzer, a pianist of Austro-Hungarian descent. She lived in Washington with her parents and older brother, Walter, until the family moved to New York City around 1900, as her parents pursued musical careers.

In 1913, she became acquainted with writer Max Eastman in Greenwich Village, and the two became romantically involved.

Career
Deshon appeared in more than twenty silent films, beginning in 1915 with The Beloved Vagabond. In 1919, while living in New York, she was summoned by Samuel Goldwyn to Los Angeles, California, and offered her work in his studio.

Deshon played in features for Vitagraph Studios until 1921. Her final film credit was in the role of Sally McTurk in The Roof Tree, directed by John Francis Dillon. She returned to New York City with her mother in December 1921, hoping to continue her work in films there.

Personal life
In addition to her relationship with Eastman, Deshon had a purported romantic relationship with Charlie Chaplin while living in Los Angeles and purportedly "commuted from coast to coast" between the two men.

Death
On February 4, 1922, Deshon was found unconscious on the third floor of her apartment building at 120 West Eleventh Street. A window was open in her bedroom, but illuminating gas flowed from an opened jet. A newspaperwoman, Minnie Morris, found Deshon when she returned to the building. An ambulance took Deshon to St. Vincent's Hospital, but attempts to revive her were unsuccessful. She died the following afternoon, aged 28. Deshon's apartment had been subleased from Doris Stevens, who was married to Dudley Field Malone. The couple were honeymooning in Europe at the time of the actress' death. She died five days after William Desmond Taylor, who overshadowed her.

A medical examiner concluded Deshon's death was accidental. However, rumors persisted among her circle of friends and acquaintances that she might have committed suicide, and several biographers, including Ross Wetzsteon and Christoph Irmscher, have described her death as such. An unsubstantiated comment from a neighbor had it that she had recently argued with a person who came to her apartment. Having recently broken off their relationship, Eastman claimed that Deshon had no reason to kill herself and that her death was accidental; he had come across her on the street on the afternoon before her death when they spoke briefly before going their separate ways. That evening, Eastman heard that she had been rushed to hospital whilst he was watching a theatre performance. He went to St. Vincent's and gave blood, but the attempt to revive Deshon was futile.

Filmography

See also
List of unsolved deaths

References

Works cited

Further reading
New York Times, "Actress Dies Of Poison Gas", February 5, 1922, p. 3
New York Times, "Eastman Denies Rift With Miss Deshon", February 6, 1922, p. 3

External links

Photograph (1921) by Margrethe Mather, Metropolitan Museum of Modern Art

1893 births
1922 deaths
1922 suicides
20th-century American actresses
Accidental deaths in New York (state)
Actresses from Tacoma, Washington
American silent film actresses
American people of Austrian descent
American people of Welsh descent
Deaths by poisoning
People from Pierce County, Washington
Unsolved deaths in the United States